Józef Krzysztof Leśniak (6 March 1968 – 4 May 2022) was a Polish politician. A member of the Law and Justice party, he served in the Sejm from 2015 to 2019. He died on 4 May 2022, at the age of 54.

References

1968 births
2022 deaths
21st-century Polish politicians
SGH Warsaw School of Economics alumni
Law and Justice politicians
Members of the Polish Sejm 2015–2019
People from Limanowa